Cheng Tinghua (also known as Cheng Yingfang) (1848–1900) was a renowned master of Chinese Neijia (internal) martial art Bagua Zhang.

Biography
Born in the Cheng family village, Shen County, Hebei (now in Shandong), he was the third of four brothers.

Cheng had pock marks on his face when he was young and thus he was known as “third son with pock marks” Cheng. Cheng Tinghua was fond of martial arts and in his youth he gained skill at wielding a nearly 4 foot long broadsword and a large heavy staff.

Shuai Chiao learning in Beijing
When Cheng was still fairly young, he left his hometown and went to Beijing to apprentice with a gentleman who made eyeglasses. Intent on improving his martial arts skill, Cheng also began to study Chinese wrestling (Shuai Chiao) when he arrived in Beijing.

In the late 1800s, two wrestling styles were popular in Beijing, Manchurian/Mongolian wrestling and Pao Ting “fast style” wrestling. The Pao Ting style was quicker than the Manchurian style. As soon as the opponent came in contact with the wrestler, he would be thrown. There was not any grappling, struggling, or tussling as seen in Western wrestling. This wrestling also combined punching, kicking, joint locking and point striking with its throwing techniques.

Cheng Tinghua was an avid wrestler and studied both of the popular wrestling styles when he was a young man in Beijing. He practiced hard and made a name for himself as a wrestler. He was not a big name in the martial arts world yet, however, most martial artists in Beijing knew of him and knew he was skilled at shuai chiao.

Learning with Dong Haichuan
By 1870, Dong Haichuan had become very well known in Beijing (research indicates that Dong first arrived in Beijing around 1865). When Cheng was approximately 28 years old (1876), he sought out Dong in order to improve his skill. Some say that Cheng had become friends with Yin Fu and Shih Chidong (two of Dong Haichuan's first Bagua Zhang students) and that they had encouraged him to go and meet Dong.

When the two first met, Dong asked Cheng to use his shuai chiao against him. Cheng made several attempts at attacking Dong but was never able to even lay a hand on him. Cheng knelt down and asked Dong if he could become his student. At this point in time, Dong had not accepted many Bagua Zhang students. Although Dong had taught many people martial arts in Prince Su's residence, it is said  that he had only taught Bagua to three people prior to teaching Cheng Tinghua. The large majority of his students in the palace were said to have learned something other than Bagua from Dong.

If those who say Dong's original tombstone had his students listed in the order in which he taught them are correct, then Cheng was indeed Dong's fourth disciple, as his name appears fourth on the list. The first name listed on this stele is Yin Fu, followed by Ma Wei-Chi, Shih Chi-Tung, and then Cheng Tinghua. The year Cheng met Dong was approximately 1876. Dong died in 1882, so at best Cheng studied with Dong for 5 or 6 years.

Dong Haichuan was known to have only accepted Baguazhang students who were already skilled in some other style of martial art. It is said that after laying a Bagua foundation with the circle walk practice, single palm change, double palm change, and smooth changing palm, Dong would teach the student Baguazhang based on what the student already knew. Taking this information to be true, we can assume that Dong would have taught Cheng using Cheng's knowledge of shuai chiao as a base.

Sharing his learning
The Bagua styles which most notably display a Xingyi Quan flavor are the styles which were taught by Cheng and his friends Li Cunyi, Liu Dekuan, and Zhang Zhaodong. Although all three of these Xingyiquan masters are recorded as being Baguazhang students of Dong Haichuan, there is evidence that suggests Li, Liu, and Zhang learned their Bagua from Cheng Tinghua, not from Dong Haichuan.

The link between Xingyi Quan and Bagua was most likely forged when Cheng Tinghua and his friends Li Cunyi, Zhang Zhaodong, Liu Dekuan, and Liu Wai-Hsiang got together to compare styles and learn from each other (Li Cunyi, Liu Te-Kuan, and Zhang Zhaodong were all Xingyi boxing brothers under the same teacher, Liu Chi-Lan. Liu Wai-Hsiang was a Xingyi Quan student of Zhang Zhaodong).

Cheng Tinghua was a very open martial artist who would teach his Bagua to anyone who cared to learn it. He enjoyed meeting other martial artists to compare styles and share the techniques and theories of martial arts. He also enjoyed sharing his Baguazhang skill with other martial artists. Cheng is said to have been the person responsible for teaching Baguazhang to Liu Dekuan, Li Cunyi, and Zhang Zhaodong, however, since they were very skilled in Xingyi Quan and thus were Cheng's peers, he did not feel right calling them his “students.” Therefore, Cheng said that they should say they learned their Bagua from his teacher, Dong Haichuan.

Death
Cheng Tinghua was killed during the Boxer Rebellion when the Eight-Nation Alliance invaded Beijing (1900). It turns out that a group of German soldiers were forcefully recruiting locals for a work detail near Beijing's Chung Wen gate, were Cheng's shop was located. Cheng was on the street at the time and the Germans stopped him and tried to put him in line with the others. Cheng resisted and wanted to fight. He may have beaten a few soldiers during the struggle, but when he pulled out a short knife, the soldiers drew their guns. Cheng tried to run and leap over a nearby wall. As he was jumping over the wall, he was shot.

Partial list of his students
Cheng Yulung (eldest son, 1875–1928), Cheng Youxin (2nd son), Cheng Yougong, Feng Junyi, Gao Kexing, Gao Yisheng  (1866–1951), Geng Jishan, Guo Tongde, Han Qiying, Hon Mu Xi, Kan Lingfeng, Li Cunyi, Li Hanzhang, Li Wenbiao, Liu Bin, Liu Zhenzong, Qin Cheng, Sun Lu-t'ang (1861–1932), Liu Dekuan, Yang Mingshan, Zhang Changfa, Zhang Yongde, Zhang Yukui, Zhou Yu Xiang, Zhang Zhao Dong (1859–1940).

References

Bibliography
 

1848 births
1900 deaths
Chinese baguazhang practitioners
Martial arts school founders
Sportspeople from Hebei
People from Hengshui
19th-century philanthropists